Thomas Boothby Parkyns, 1st Baron Rancliffe (24 July 1755 – 17 November 1800) was an English soldier, Member of Parliament and Irish peer.

Life
He was the eldest son of Sir Thomas Parkyns, 3rd Baronet (1728–1806) of Bunny Hall, Nottinghamshire and was educated at Queens' College, Cambridge.

As an officer in the British Army he was, from 1783 to 1790, equerry to Prince Henry, Duke of Cumberland and Strathearn, the third son of the Frederick, Prince of Wales. A close friend of the Prince of Wales, he was made Colonel of the Prince of Wales Fencibles in 1794. After Prince Henry's death in 1790, Parkyns took over the lease of Rookley Manor, Hampshire until his own death from oedema in 1800, whereby he predeceased his father.

He was elected MP for Stockbridge in 1784, sitting until 1790 and then as MP for Leicester in 1790, sitting until 1800.

In 1787 he was elected a Fellow of the Royal Society as "a Gentleman well versed in various branches of Science"  In 1795 he was made an Irish peer as Baron Rancliffe.

Family

Parkyns married Elizabeth Anne, the daughter of Sir William James, MP (who died at the wedding) and had nine children. He was succeeded by his son George.

His daughter Elizabeth Anne Parkyns married Sir Richard Levinge and threy were parents to Reginald Thomas John Levinge.

His daughter Mary Charlotte (1792-1864) became Princess and Duchess of Polignac for her marriage with Prince Jules de Polignac, French Premier and 3rd Duke of Polignac.

References

 

People from Rushcliffe (district)
Alumni of Queens' College, Cambridge
Members of the Parliament of Great Britain for English constituencies
British MPs 1784–1790
British MPs 1790–1796
British MPs 1796–1800
Fellows of the Royal Society
1755 births
1800 deaths
Barons in the Peerage of Ireland
Peers of Ireland created by George III
People from Test Valley